also known as Pang or The Kobe Cannibal, was a Japanese murderer, cannibal, and necrophiliac known for the killing of Renée Hartevelt in Paris in 1981.

Sagawa murdered Hartevelt and then mutilated, cannibalized, and performed necrophilia on her corpse over several days. Sagawa was arrested and deported to Japan but was controversially released unconditionally after two years of pre-trial detention due to the applicable laws and the way his case was processed in the courts of France and Japan. Sagawa's post-release celebrity in Japan led to international publicity.

Early life
Issei Sagawa was born on 26 April 1949 in Kobe, Hyōgo Prefecture, to wealthy parents. Sagawa's father, Akira Sagawa, was a businessman who had served as president of Kurita Water Industries, and his grandfather had been an editor for The Asahi Shimbun. Sagawa was born prematurely and reportedly small enough that he could fit in the palm of his father's hand, and immediately developed enteritis, a disease of the small intestine. Sagawa eventually recovered after several injections of potassium and calcium in saline. Sagawa's fragile health and introverted personality led to him developing a strong interest in literature. Sagawa first experienced cannibalistic desires while in the first grade, after seeing a male's thigh. In a 2011 interview with Vice, Sagawa reported that as a youth he partook in bestiality with his dog and experienced cannibalistic desires for women. Sagawa attended Wako University and completed a master's degree in English Literature at Kwansei Gakuin University.

At the age of 24, while attending Wako University in Tokyo, Sagawa followed a tall German woman home, then broke into her apartment while she was sleeping. Sagawa's intention was to cannibalize her by slicing off part of her buttocks and sneaking away with a small part of her flesh, but she awoke and, according to Sagawa, thwarted his attack and pushed him to the ground. Sagawa was captured by police and charged with attempted rape, and did not confess his true intentions to authorities. Sagawa's charges of attempted rape were dropped when his father paid a settlement to the victim.

In 1977, at the age of 27, Sagawa moved to France to pursue a Ph.D. in literature at the Sorbonne in Paris. Sagawa has said that while residing in Paris, "Almost every night I would bring a prostitute home and then try to shoot them, but for some reason my fingers froze up and I couldn't pull the trigger."

Killing of Renée Hartevelt
On 11 June 1981, Sagawa, then 32, invited his Sorbonne classmate Renée Hartevelt, a Dutch woman, to dinner at his apartment at 10 Rue Erlanger, under the pretext of translating poetry for a school assignment. Sagawa planned to kill and eat her, having selected her for her health and beauty — characteristics he felt he lacked. Sagawa considered himself weak, ugly, and small (he was 144.8 cm (4 ft 9 in) tall) and claims he wanted to absorb her energy. She was 25 years old and 178 cm (5 ft 10 in). After Hartevelt arrived, she began reading poetry at a desk with her back to Sagawa when he shot her in the neck with a rifle. Sagawa said he fainted after the shock of shooting her, but awoke with the realization that he had to carry out his plan. Sagawa  raped her corpse but he could not bite into her skin because his teeth were not sharp enough, so he left the apartment and purchased a butcher knife. Sagawa consumed various parts of Hartevelt's body, eating most of her breasts, face, buttocks, feet, thighs, and neck either raw or cooked (even admitting that he swallowed her clitoris whole due to her being on her period at the time and not liking the smell of menstrual blood), while saving other parts in his refrigerator. Sagawa also took photographs of Hartevelt's body at each eating stage. Once the remains of her body that he did not consume started decomposition, Sagawa then attempted to dump the remains of Hartvelt's corpse in a lake in the Bois de Boulogne park, carrying her dismembered body parts in two suitcases, but was caught in the act and arrested by French police four days later.

Sagawa's wealthy father provided a lawyer for his defense, and after being held for two years awaiting trial, Sagawa was found legally insane and unfit to stand trial by the French judge, Jean-Louis Bruguière, who ordered him held indefinitely in a mental institution. After a visit by the author Inuhiko Yomota, Sagawa's account of his kill was published in Japan under the title In the Fog. Sagawa's subsequent publicity and macabre celebrity likely contributed to the French authorities' decision to deport him to Japan, where he was immediately committed to Matsuzawa Hospital in Tokyo. His examining psychologists all declared him sane and found sexual perversion was his sole motivation for murder. As the charges against Sagawa in France had been dropped, the French court documents were sealed and were not released to Japanese authorities; consequently Sagawa could not legally be detained in Japan. Sagawa checked himself out of the hospital on 12 August 1986, and subsequently remained free until his death. Sagawa's continued freedom was widely criticized.

Post-release
Between 1986 and 1997, Sagawa was frequently invited to be a guest speaker and commentator. In 1992, Sagawa appeared in Hisayasu Sato's exploitation film Uwakizuma: Chijokuzeme (Unfaithful Wife: Shameful Torture) as a sado-sexual voyeur. Sagawa wrote books about the murder he committed, as well as Shonen A, a book on the 1997 Kobe child murders. Sagawa also wrote restaurant reviews for the Japanese magazine Spa. Sagawa could no longer find publishers for his writing and he struggled to find employment. Sagawa was nearly accepted by a French language school because the manager was impressed by his courage in using his real name, but employees protested and he was rejected.

In 2005, Sagawa's parents died and he was prevented from attending their funeral, but repaid their creditors and moved into public housing. Sagawa received welfare benefits for a time. In an interview with Vice magazine in 2011, Sagawa said that being forced to make a living while being known as a murderer and cannibal was a terrible punishment. In 2013, Sagawa was hospitalized from a cerebral infarction, which permanently damaged his nervous system. He later lived alone and needed daily assistance, which was provided by his younger brother or from caregivers. At the time, he claimed to have regretted the obsession.

Death
Issei Sagawa died due to complications of pneumonia at a hospital in Tokyo, on 24 November 2022, at the age of 73.

In popular culture
Media inspired by, featuring, or depicting Sagawa include:
 Interview with a Cannibal (Vice, US, 2011, 34 minutes)
 Caniba (Véréna Paravel and Lucien Castaing-Taylor, France, 2017, 97 minutes)
 Adoration, a short 1986 film by Olivier Smolders, is based on Sagawa's story.
 "La Folie", a 1981 song by The Stranglers, was inspired by Sagawa's story.
 "Too Much Blood", a song on the Rolling Stones' 1983 album Undercover, is about Sagawa and violence in the media.

References

External links
Issei Sagawa interview on YouTube, made by Vice

1949 births
2022 deaths
Japanese cannibals
Japanese people with disabilities
Japanese non-fiction writers
Necrophiles
1981 murders in France
Japanese murderers
People acquitted by reason of insanity
Murder in Paris
1981 in Paris
20th-century non-fiction writers
Wako University alumni
Kwansei Gakuin University alumni
Paris-Sorbonne University alumni
Controversies in Japan
Japanese expatriates in France
1980s murders in Paris
Deaths from pneumonia in Japan